G&SWR 45 Class may refer to:

 G&SWR 45 Class 0-6-2T
 G&SWR 45 Class 2-2-2